After the Riot at Newport is an album by the Nashville All-Stars, which was recorded live after the cancellation of their appearance at the 1960 Newport Jazz Festival.

History
This group of Nashville session players played a mixture of pop and jazz standards. The all-star lineup featured guitar legends Hank Garland and Chet Atkins, saxophonist Boots Randolph, African-American pianist/violinist Brenton Banks, pianist Floyd Cramer, bassist Bob Moore, drummer Buddy Harman, and vibes prodigy Gary Burton, who was only 17 years old at the time.

Even though the players were playing country music day-in and day-out in Nashville sessions, they had a deep love of jazz and played often at the Carousel Club on Printer's Alley in Nashville, Tennessee. When their much-anticipated festival performance was canceled due to an unruly crowd, the group documented their performance anyway, recording on the back porch of a mansion RCA had rented during the festival (depicted by the drawing on the cover).

Two of the songs, "Nashville to Newport" and "Riot-Chous" were composed for the occasion, the latter after the riot on the night prior to recording.

Other groups since have taken the name Nashville All-Stars.

Reception

AllMusic critic Thom Owens called the album "a surprisingly jazzy effort, highllighted by some excellent leads by Atkins, yet it is a bit too down-home for jazzbos, and a bit too polished for country fans. Nevertheless, fans of pure musicianship will find plenty to treasure on the album."

Reissues
 Originally released in 1960 by RCA, it was re-released on CD by Bear Family Records (BCD 15447) in 1989 with liner notes by Rich Kienzle, based on interviews with Bob Moore and other participants.

Track listing

Side one
 "Relaxin (Jimmy Guinn) – 11:11
 "Nashville to Newport" (Chet Atkins) – 3:18
 "Opus de Funk" (Horace Silver) – 6:14

Side two
 "S Wonderful" (George Gershwin, Ira Gershwin) – 4:35
 "'Round Midnight" (Bernie Hanighen, Thelonious Monk, Cootie Williams) – 4:39
 "Frankie and Johnny" (Traditional) – 3:37
 "Riot-Chous" (Hank Garland, Boots Randolph) – 8:57

Personnel
 Hank Garland – guitar
 Chet Atkins – guitar
 Boots Randolph – alto and tenor saxophone
 Brenton Banks – piano, violin
 Floyd Cramer – piano
 Gary Burton – vibraphone
 Bob Moore – double bass
 Buddy Harman – drums

Production notes
Produced by Steve Sholes
Mastered by Bob Jones
Reissue producer, photography by Richard Weize
Liner notes by George Wein
Reissue Liner notes by Rich Kienzle
Cover art by Jim Flora

See also
The Nashville A-Team

References

External links
George Wein's original liner notes
Jim Flora cover art

1960 live albums
Albums produced by Steve Sholes
Albums recorded at the Newport Jazz Festival
Chet Atkins live albums
RCA Victor live albums